The Apollo Theater Chicago was built in Chicago's Lincoln Park neighborhood in 1978, by theatre producers Jason Brett and Stuart Oken. Located at 2540 N. Lincoln Ave., the Apollo has 440 seats and a lobby featuring art exhibits and a full bar. The theatre is also the home of the Emerald City Theatre Company. The Apollo Theater Chicago has no relation to the Apollo Theater in New York City.

History

The Apollo Theater Chicago is not the first Chicago theater to bear the name Apollo. In 1921, theatrical producer A. H. Woods opened the Apollo Theatre in the Chicago Loop District, at the corner of Randolph and Dearborn Streets. Originally operated as a playhouse, the old Apollo Theatre was sold in 1927 to United Artists Corporation and was renamed the United Artists Theatre. It was demolished in 1989.

In 1991 Michael Leavitt and Fox Theatricals took ownership of the venue, then in 1996 Rob Kolsen took over.

In 2005, a smaller 50 seat second stage was built, in what was formerly the Act One Bookstore. The smaller venue is popular for comedy, sketch shows, and improv theater.

Previous Productions 
Notable productions at the new Apollo included David Mamet's Sexual Perversity in Chicago starring James Belushi, Balm in Gilead with John Malkovich and Gary Sinise, the long running play The Vagina Monologues, and A Nutcracker Christmas written by children's recording artist Ralph Covert and G. Riley Mills. From October 1 2008 to January 17 2016, the Musical Million Dollar Quartet played at the venue, making it the longest running Broadway musical in Chicago.

References

External links
 

Theatres in Chicago